Straja is a commune in Suceava County, Bukovina, northeastern Romania. It is composed of a single village, more specifically Straja.

History 

The first document attesting the existence of Straja dates since 1750. Part of Bukovina, it was under Austrian rule until 1918.

Demographics 

In 2011, Straja had a population of 5,094, mostly Romanian, and the major religion is Orthodoxy.

In 1930, according to the census taken in that year, Straja had a population of 4,662, of whom 4,338 were classified as ethnically Romanian, 137 German (more specifically Bukovina Germans), 134 Jewish, 29 Russian, and 15 Polish. The numbers by religion were 4,359 Orthodox, 145 Roman Catholic, 134 Jewish, 13 Evangelical Lutheran, 10 Greek Catholic, and 1 Baptist.

Politics and local administration

Communal council 

The commune's current local council has the following political composition, according to the results of the 2020 Romanian local elections:

Natives 

 Nicolae Cotos
 Dimitrie Onciul

Geoposition 

Straja is situated in the northern part of Suceava county (47.92° N, 25.55° E), in the Rădăuți valley and is on the banks of the Suceava River. The northern edge of the commune is part of Romania's border with Ukraine.

Economy 

The main industry is wood processing.

Transport 

Straja has a station on the Suceava to Nisipitu railway line, which traverses the commune from east to west.

County road 209 from Rădăuți to Brodina connects the commune to Romania's national road system. An hourly minibus service, with a journey time of 50 minutes, connects Rădăuți and Straja.

References 

Communes in Suceava County
Localities in Southern Bukovina
Duchy of Bukovina